Harold Scott MacDonald "Donald" Coxeter,  (9 February 1907 – 31 March 2003) was a British and later also Canadian geometer. He is regarded as one of the greatest geometers of the 20th century.

Biography 
Coxeter was born in Kensington to Harold Samuel Coxeter and Lucy. His father had taken over the family business of Coxeter & Son, manufacturers of surgical instruments and compressed gases (including a mechanism for anaesthetising surgical patients with nitrous oxide), but was able to retire early and focus on sculpting and baritone singing; Lucy Coxeter was a portrait and landscape painter who had attended the Royal Academy of Arts. A maternal cousin was the architect Sir Giles Gilbert Scott.

In his youth, Coxeter composed music and was an accomplished pianist at the age of 10. He felt that mathematics and music were intimately related, outlining his ideas in a 1962 article on "Music and Mathematics" in the Canadian Music Journal.

He was educated at King Alfred School, London and St George's School, Harpenden, where his best friend was John Flinders Petrie, later a mathematician for whom Petrie polygons were named. He was accepted at King's College, Cambridge in 1925, but decided to spend a year studying in hopes of gaining admittance to Trinity College, where the standard of mathematics was higher. Coxeter won an entrance scholarship and went to Trinity College, Cambridge in 1926 to read mathematics. There he earned his BA (as Senior Wrangler) in 1928, and his doctorate in 1931. In 1932 he went to Princeton University for a year as a Rockefeller Fellow, where he worked with Hermann Weyl, Oswald Veblen, and Solomon Lefschetz. Returning to Trinity for a year, he attended Ludwig Wittgenstein's seminars on the philosophy of mathematics. In 1934 he spent a further year at Princeton as a Procter Fellow.

In 1936 Coxeter moved to the University of Toronto. In 1938 he and P. Du Val, H.T. Flather, and John Flinders Petrie published The Fifty-Nine Icosahedra with University of Toronto Press. In 1940 Coxeter edited the eleventh edition of Mathematical Recreations and Essays,<ref>{{cite journal|author=Frame, J. S.|title=Review: Mathematical Recreations and Essays, 11th edition, by W. W. Rouse Ball; revised by H. S. M. Coxeter|journal=Bull. Amer. Math. Soc.|year=1940|volume=45|issue=3|pages=211–213|url=https://www.ams.org/journals/bull/1940-46-03/S0002-9904-1940-07170-8/S0002-9904-1940-07170-8.pdf|doi=10.1090/S0002-9904-1940-07170-8}}</ref> originally published by W. W. Rouse Ball in 1892. He was elevated to professor in 1948. Coxeter was elected a Fellow of the Royal Society of Canada in 1948 and a Fellow of the Royal Society in 1950. He met M. C. Escher in 1954 and the two became lifelong friends; his work on geometric figures helped inspire some of Escher's works, particularly the Circle Limit series based on hyperbolic tessellations. He also inspired some of the innovations of Buckminster Fuller. Coxeter, M. S. Longuet-Higgins and J. C. P. Miller were the first to publish the full list of uniform polyhedra (1954).

He worked for 60 years at the University of Toronto and published twelve books.

Personal life

Coxeter was a vegetarian. He attributed his longevity to his vegetarian diet, daily exercise such as fifty press-ups and standing on his head for fifteen minutes each morning, and consuming a nightly cocktail made from Kahlua, peach schnapps, and soy milk.

Awards
Since 1978, the Canadian Mathematical Society have awarded the Coxeter–James Prize in his honor.

He was made a Fellow of the Royal Society in 1950 and in 1997 he was awarded their Sylvester Medal. In 1990, he became a Foreign Member of the American Academy of Arts and Sciences and in 1997 was made a Companion of the Order of Canada.

In 1973 he received the Jeffery–Williams Prize.

A festschrift in his honour, The Geometric Vein, was published in 1982. It contained 41 essays on geometry, based on a symposium for Coxeter held at Toronto in 1979.  A second such volume, The Coxeter Legacy, was published in 2006 based on a Toronto Coxeter symposium held in 2004.

Works
 1940: Regular and Semi-Regular Polytopes I, Mathematische Zeitschrift 46: 380-407, MR 2,10 
 1942: Non-Euclidean Geometry (1st edition), (2nd ed, 1947), (3rd ed, 1957), (4th ed, 1961), (5th ed, 1965), University of Toronto Press (6th ed, 1998), MAA.
 1954: (with Michael S. Longuet-Higgins and J. C. P. Miller) "Uniform Polyhedra", Philosophical Transactions of the Royal Society A 246: 401–50 
 1949: The Real Projective Plane 1957: (with W.O.J. Moser) Generators and Relations for Discrete Groups 1980: Second edition, Springer-Verlag 
 1961: Introduction to Geometry 1963: Regular Polytopes (2nd edition), Macmillan Company
 1967: (with S. L. Greitzer) Geometry Revisited 1970: Twisted honeycombs (American Mathematical Society, 1970, Regional conference series in mathematics Number 4)
 1973: Regular Polytopes, (3rd edition), Dover edition, 
 1974: Projective Geometry (2nd edition)
 1974: Regular Complex Polytopes, Cambridge University Press
 1981: (with R. Frucht and D. L. Powers), Zero-Symmetric Graphs, Academic Press.
 1985: Regular and Semi-Regular Polytopes II, Mathematische Zeitschrift 188: 559–591
 1987 Projective Geometry (1987) 
 1988: Regular and Semi-Regular Polytopes III, Mathematische Zeitschrift 200: 3–45
 1995: F. Arthur Sherk, Peter McMullen, Anthony C. Thompson and Asia Ivić Weiss, editors: Kaleidoscopes — Selected Writings of H.S.M. Coxeter. John Wiley and Sons 
 1999: The Beauty of Geometry: Twelve Essays'', Dover Publications,

See also
 Coxeter–James Prize
 Spiral similarity

References

Further reading

External links 
 

Harold Scott MacDonald Coxeter archival papers held at the University of Toronto Archives and Records Management Services
 
 H. S. M. Coxeter (1907–2003), Erich W. Ellers, Branko Grünbaum, Peter McMullen, Asia Ivic Weiss Notices of the AMS: Volume 50, Number 10.
  www.donaldcoxeter.com www.math.yorku.ca/dcoxeter webpages dedicated to him (in development)
 Jaron's World: Shapes in Other Dimensions, Discover mag., Apr 2007
 The Mathematics in the Art of M.C. Escher video of a lecture by H.S.M. Coxeter, April 28, 2000.

1907 births
2003 deaths
Companions of the Order of Canada
Fellows of the Royal Society
Fellows of the Royal Society of Canada
British geometers
Chirality
Polytopes
20th-century English mathematicians
Recreational mathematicians
Alumni of Trinity College, Cambridge
Academic staff of the University of Toronto
Canadian mathematicians
People from Harpenden
Academics of the University of East Anglia
Senior Wranglers
Presidents of the Canadian Mathematical Society
Canadian Fellows of the Royal Society